Stamford is a city in Fairfield County, Connecticut,  outside of Manhattan. It is Connecticut's second-most populous city, behind Bridgeport. With a population of 135,470, Stamford passed Hartford and New Haven in population as of the 2020 census. It is in the Bridgeport-Stamford-Norwalk-Danbury metropolitan statistical area, which is part of the New York City metropolitan area (specifically, the New York–Newark, NY–NJ–CT–PA Combined Statistical Area).

As of 2019, Stamford is home to nine Fortune 500 companies and numerous divisions of large corporations. This gives it the largest financial district in the New York metropolitan region outside New York City and one of the nation's largest concentrations of corporations. Dominant sectors of Stamford's economy include financial services, tourism, information technology, healthcare, telecommunications, transportation, and retail. Its metropolitan division is home to colleges and universities including UConn Stamford and Norwalk Community College.

History

Stamford was known as Rippowam by the Siwanoy Native American inhabitants of the region, and the very first European settlers in the area also called it that. The present name is after the town of Stamford, Lincolnshire, England. The deed to Stamford was signed on July 1, 1640, between Captain Turner of the New Haven Colony and Chief Ponus. By the 18th century, one of the town's primary industries was merchandising by water, which was possible due to Stamford's proximity to New York.

In 1692, Stamford was home to a less famous witch trial than the well-known Salem witch trials, which also occurred in 1692. The accusations were less fanatical and on a smaller scale, but they also grew to prominence through gossip and hysterics.

New Canaan officially separated from Stamford when it incorporated as a town in 1801, followed by Darien in 1820.

Starting in the late 19th century, New York residents built summer homes on the shoreline, and some moved to Stamford permanently and started commuting to Manhattan by train. Stamford incorporated as a city in 1893.

In 1950, the U.S. Census Bureau reported the city's population as 94.6% white and 5.2% black.

In the 1960s and 1970s, Stamford's commercial real estate boomed as corporations relocated from New York City to peripheral areas. A massive urban redevelopment campaign during that time resulted in a downtown with many tall office buildings. The F.D. Rich Company was the city-designated urban renewal developer of the downtown area in an ongoing, contentious project beginning in the 1960s and continuing through the 1970s. The company put up what was the city's tallest structure, One Landmark Square, at 21 floors high, and the GTE building (now One Stamford Forum), along with the Marriott Hotel, the Stamford Town Center and many other downtown office buildings. One Landmark Square has since been dwarfed by the new 34-story Park Tower Stamford condominium tower, and again by the Atlantic Station development, another Rich Company project in partnership with Cappelli Enterprises. Over the years, other developers have joined in building up the downtown, a process that continued through the 1980s and 1990s and into the new century.

Since 2008, an  mixed-use redevelopment project for Stamford's Harbor Point neighborhood has added additional growth south of downtown. The redevelopment plan included  of new residential, retail, office and hotel space, and a marina. In July 2012, roughly 900 of the projected 4,000 Harbor Point residential units had been constructed. New restaurants and recreational activities have come up in the Harbor Point area, which is considered New Stamford. From 2008 to 2017, the city issued permits for 4,341 housing units.

During the COVID-19 pandemic in the U.S., many New Yorkers relocated to Stamford and its metropolitan area.

Geography

Stamford is the state's largest city by area.

Stamford is near the southwestern point of Connecticut, on Long Island Sound; it is part of the Gold Coast. Stamford comprises approximately 45 distinct neighborhoods and villages, and two historic districts, including Cove, East Side, Downtown, North Stamford, Glenbrook, West Side, Turn of River, Waterside, Springdale, Belltown, Ridgeway, Newfield, South End, Westover, Shippan, Roxbury, and Palmers Hill.

North of the Merritt Parkway is considered the North Stamford section of the city, encompassing its largest land mass though it is the least densely populated. North Stamford functionally and legally acts as one municipality with the city of Stamford. Stamford borders Pound Ridge, New York to the north, the Long Island Sound to the south, Greenwich to the west, Darien to the east, and New Canaan to the northeast.

The city has islands in Long Island Sound: Cove Island, Grass Island, Greenway Island, Jack Island, and Cuties Island (also known as Vincent Island). Cove Island is a prominent beach and recreation area.

Climate

Under the Köppen climate classification, Stamford has a temperate climate (Cfa), with long, hot summers, and cool to cold winters, with precipitation spread fairly evenly throughout the year. Like the rest of coastal Connecticut, it lies in the broad transition zone between the colder continental climates of the northern U.S. and southern Canada to the north, and the warmer temperate and subtropical climates of the middle and south Atlantic states to the south.

The warm/hot season in Stamford is from mid-April through early November. Late day thundershowers are common in the hottest months (June, July, August, September), despite the mostly sunny skies. The cool/cold season is from late November though mid-March. Winter weather is far more variable than summer weather along the Connecticut coast, ranging from sunny days with higher temperatures to cold and blustery conditions with occasional snow. As on much of the Connecticut coast and nearby Long Island, some of the winter precipitation is rain or a mix and rain and wet snow.

Although infrequent, tropical cyclones (hurricanes/tropical storms) have struck Connecticut and the Stamford metropolitan area. Hurricane landfalls have occurred along the Connecticut coast in 1903, 1938, 1944, 1954 (Carol), 1960 (Donna), Hurricane Gloria in 1985, and Hurricane Sandy in 2012.

Stamford lies in USDA garden zone 7a. It averages about 90 days annually with freeze. Coastal Connecticut is the broad transition zone where so-called "subtropical indicator" plants and other broadleaf evergreens can be cultivated. As such, Southern Magnolias, Needle Palms, Windmill palm, Loblolly Pines, and Crape Myrtles are grown in private and public gardens. As in much of coastal Connecticut, Long Island, and coastal New Jersey, the growing season is rather long in Stamford, averaging 210 days from April8 to November5 according to the National Weather Service in Bridgeport.

Demographics

Census data from 2020 showed the City of Stamford with a population of 135,470. This was a 10.5% increase from 2010. Census data also showed Stamford had surpassed New Haven's population, making it the state's second-most populous city, behind Bridgeport.

In 2020, the racial makeup of the city was 49.3% non-Hispanic white, 14.1% Black or African American, 0.3% American Indian or Alaska Native, 8.6% Asian American, 3.2% from two or more races, and 27.2% Hispanic or Latino (of any race). 2020 American Community Survey estimates show that of the Hispanic or Latin American population, Guatemalans form the largest group (6.75% of the city's population), followed by Puerto Ricans (3.77%), Colombians (2.87%), Ecuadorians (2.42%), and Mexicans (2.38%). In 2018, 5.9% of the city was West Indian. The median age was 37.2 in 2018, lower than the national average of 37.9.

There were 54,513 housing units at the 2018 estimates and 50,847 households. The average household size was 2.53 and there were approximately 31,347 families living in the city. The owner-occupied housing rate was 46.6% and the renter-occupied housing rate was 53.4%. Stamford's median household income in 2021 was $99,792 and the per capita income was $58,297, the highest of any city in Connecticut. The average household income was $143,222. About 9.3% of the population was at or below the poverty line.

In 2010, its population was 122,643. At the U.S. Census Bureau's mid-year 2010 estimates, it grew to 122,902. Roughly 49.8% of the population was non-Hispanic white, 12.9% Black or African American, 0.2% American Indian or Alaska Native, 6.8% Asian, 1.6% from two or more races, and 28.3% Hispanic or Latino. The American Community Survey determined there were 46,396 households. The average household size was 2.56 and the average family size was 3.15. The owner-occupied housing rate was 56.5% and the renter-occupied rate was 43.5%.

The 2000 census determined Stamford had a population of 117,083. The proportion of the population under the age of 18 was 21.6%, age 18 to 24 was 7.8%, age 25 to 44 was 32.5%, age 45 to 64 was 25.0%, and 65 years of age or older was 13.1%. The median age of 37.1 was slightly lower than the U.S. median age of 37.2. Composition of the population based on sex was 50.7 females to 49.3 males.

According to Sperling's BestPlaces, 64.0% of the city's inhabitants are religious or religiously affiliated. The largest religious group in the city are Christians, followed by Judaism, Islam, and eastern religions including Hinduism and Buddhism. The largest Christian denomination in the city is the Roman Catholic Church, served by the Roman Catholic Diocese of Bridgeport.

Crime 
According to FBI statistics in 2014, Stamford is the 16th safest of the 269 cities in the nation and well ahead of any in Connecticut with a population greater than 100,000 that report crime statistics to the FBI. In 2015, Stamford reported three murders, 19 rapes, and 92 robberies. Crime in Stamford is much more controlled in comparison to cities with similar population size in Connecticut and nationally. Lower crime rates in Stamford are attributed to the city's robust economic growth in recent decades. Criminal cases are prosecuted by the State's Attorney's Office, and Stamford is home to a State Superior Court, at 123 Hoyt Street, adjacent to the Stamford Police Headquarters.

Economy 

Stamford's cluster of corporate headquarters includes a number of Fortune 500, Fortune 1000, and Forbes Global 2000 companies. In 2017, Stamford had four Fortune 500, nine Fortune 1000, three Forbes Global 2000, and one Fortune Global 500 company.

Among the larger companies with headquarters in Stamford are Charter Communications, Harman International, Synchrony Financial, Indeed.com, Webster Bank, United Rentals, Conair, Gartner, Henkel North American Consumer Goods, WWE, Pitney Bowes, ITT Inc., Gen Re, NBC Sports Group, Nestle Waters North America, Crane Co. and Vineyard Vines. UBS's Stamford trading floor held the Guinness World Record as the largest columnless trading floor in the world until surrendering that space in 2017. The building was sold after the bank downsized. The Royal Bank of Scotland moved its North American operations into Stamford in 2009, including its RBS Greenwich Capital subsidiary.

The Harbor Point development, in the South End, is one of the nation's largest private-sector development projects. Many large retail stores, such as Design within Reach (also headquartered in Stamford), have moved in, along with multiple companies including ITV America, McKinsey & Company, Bridgewater Associates, and Kayak.com.

Arts and culture

Science and nature

 The Stamford Museum and Nature Center on a  site in the northern end of town has a collection of works by Gutzon Borglum, the sculptor of Mount Rushmore, who was a Stamford resident for a decade.
 The Fairfield County Astronomical Society was started in 1954 and runs the Stamford Observatory, which has a  telescope.
 Bartlett Arboretum and Gardens is a  botanical gardens and science education center with over 850 specimen trees and plants from around the world. It is also home to several Champion Trees, the largest of their species in Connecticut.
 SoundWaters Community Center for Environmental Education is in Cove Island Park.

Theater, film, and video

 Curtain Call Inc. presents plays and other entertainment at the Sterling Farms Theatre Complex, 1349 Newfield Avenue.
 Stamford Center for the Arts: The Palace Theatre, originally opened as a vaudeville house in 1927 and reopened as a nonprofit theater in 1983. It was joined in 1992 by the Rich Forum, another downtown venue. Both have been run by the Stamford Center for the Arts.
Latham Park
 The Rich Forum is occupied by NBCUniversal as a television studio where various television shows are taped and produced, including Jerry Springer, Maury, The Steve Wilkos Show, The Trisha Goddard Show, and Crazy Talk.
 Bow Tie Cinemas has two first-run movie houses in Stamford with a total of 14 movie screens: Landmark8 and Majestic6. The Avon Theatre Film Center, a two-screen nonprofit movie house focusing on first-run independent movies, is on Bedford Street. The Ferguson Library also shows movies.

Movies shot in Stamford

Music
 In a typical season, the Stamford Symphony Orchestra gives five pairs of classical concerts and three pops concerts at the 1,586-seat Palace Theatre, as well as a concert for elementary school students and a family concert series.
 Connecticut Grand Opera, a not-for-profit, professional opera company, performs at the Palace Theatre. On its website, the CGO claims to offer "the most ambitious opera season of any company between New York and Boston".
 Alive @ Five is an annual summer concert series in Columbus Park typically lasting six weeks.
 Treetops CMS, a nonprofit chamber music organization, is in Westover, providing six chamber music concerts annually, as well as art exhibits and installations.

Fine art
 UCONN Stamford Art Gallery showcases both emerging and established artists.
Franklin Street Works maintains an art space in the downtown area.
 Fernando Luis Alvarez Gallery is a contemporary art gallery in Connecticut with diverse international exhibitions.
 Stamford Loft Artists Association provides support for visual artists and opportunities to exhibit their work.

Libraries 
Stamford's public library, the Ferguson Library, is one of the largest in Connecticut. The library also shows movies and has a used book store run by Friends of Ferguson Library.

The library has branches in South End, Springdale, and the Turn of River sections of the city, it also has a bookmobile that runs daily to different neighborhoods. The Turn of River branch, officially called the Harry Bennett Branch, is the largest library branch in the state. That branch also has a used book store run by Friends of Ferguson Library.

Parks and recreation 

Mill River Park is in the center of downtown. Its ancient grist mill (present when George Washington traveled through Stamford) was modernized in the 1920s. There are numerous community activities offered at the park coordinated by the Mill River Park Collaborative.
Cummings Park, a public beach, was once a popular spot for shell fishing. The park was developed in 1906 and had been known as Halloween Park because Mayor Homer Cummings cast the deciding vote to create it on Halloween Night.
 The  Cove Island Park, once a farm and then an enormous factory site (Stamford Manufacturing Company), has beaches, picnic grounds and bluffs. It has a small wildlife sanctuary in the southwest corner that might be interesting for bird watchers. The SoundWaters Community Center for Environmental Education is in the park.
 Jackie Robinson Park on the West Side is named after baseball legend Jackie Robinson, who lived in Stamford.
 Terry Connors Ice Rink shares a parking lot with Cove Island Park. It offers public ice skating, group lessons, and ice hockey. It is the home of the Stamford Youth Hockey Association.
 Scalzi Park on Bridge Street has a playground, baseball and softball fields, volleyball courts, tennis courts, bocce courts, basketball courts, roller hockey courts, and a baseball park, Cubeta Stadium. A concrete skate park was opened at Scalzi in July 2007 for $309,850, designed and built by Grindline Skateparks Inc.
 Stamford has two municipal golf courses. Sterling Farms Golf Course opened in May 1972 and is the more popular. The facility also has a driving range, restaurant, and six tennis courts.
 The E. Gaynor Brennan Golf Course, known locally as Hubbard Heights, opened for play in 1922 as a private course and was purchased by the city in 1949.
 Dorothy Heroy Park is in North Stamford.
 The Italian Center features tennis courts, swimming pools, fitness centers, a playground and a miniature golf course.
 The Stamford YMCA offers swimming lessons and sports, including basketball and indoor soccer. Programs are also available periodically for physical fitness.
 The Stamford Yacht Club is a private organization that provides members with access to boating activities and additional amenities.

Politics and government 

Stamford is predominantly Democratic but not nearly as heavily Democratic as Connecticut's more urban cities like Bridgeport and New Haven. In 2008, Democrat Barack Obama received 64.06% of the city vote to Republican John McCain's 35.35%.

Democrat Caroline Simmons is Stamford's current mayor. Notable Republicans from the city include former U.S. Representative Chris Shays, former Lieutenant Governor Michael Fedele, and former mayor Michael Pavia. Prominent Democrats from Stamford include current Attorney General William Tong, former two-term Governor Dannel Malloy, former Attorney General and incumbent senior U.S. Senator Richard Blumenthal, former Attorney General George Jepsen, former U.S. Attorney General and former mayor Homer Stille Cummings, Connecticut Supreme Court Justice Andrew J. McDonald, and Chief Justice of the Connecticut Supreme Court Richard A. Robinson. Other notable politicians with Stamford roots include Carrie Clyde Holly, the first woman (along with two colleagues) elected to serve in a State Legislature (Colorado, from Pueblo County in the 1894 election) in U.S. history, Joe Lieberman, former Attorney General of Connecticut and Independent/Democratic U.S. Senator who was Al Gore's vice-presidential nominee in the 2000 presidential election; William F. Buckley, Jr., conservative commentator; and French Prime Minister Georges Clemenceau.

Stamford has consistently received a perfect score from the Human Rights Campaign for LGBT-friendly policies since 2016.

Education

Stamford has branches of the University of Connecticut, University of Bridgeport and Sacred Heart University. The University of Connecticut's campus is in a large modern building downtown that opened in 1998 after extensive renovations to an abandoned former Bloomingdale's store that had closed in 1990. The University of Bridgeport has a branch at the River Bend Executive Center, and Sacred Heart University has a branch at Landmark Square. In 2017, UCONN Stamford opened a 300-student dormitory around the corner from the Stamford Campus on Washington Blvd.

As no study has been conducted to assess the cost of education in Stamford, it is difficult to tell whether Stamford has a well-funded public education system. Public education is a state responsibility, and Connecticut ranks near the bottom in state share of public education expenditures. Thus most education funding must come from local governments like Stamford's. According to the State Department of Education, in the 2004–2005 academic year, 42.7% of Stamford's public school students were economically disadvantaged, 34.8% did not have English as a home language and 11.6% were students with disabilities. Research has shown that these populations need additional resources to meet state academic standards. Owing to the state school finance system, the burden of these extra necessary costs of education falls primarily on Stamford's local government. The public school system is an integrated district with racial balance requirements exceeding those of the state. State standards require that a school's racial makeup be within 25% of the community's racial makeup. Stamford's standard is 10%. Over the years, schools have become unbalanced.

Stamford has three public high schools: Westhill High School, Stamford High School, and the Academy of Information Technology and Engineering. The city also has several private schools, including Villa Maria School, and Bi-Cultural Jewish Day School, King Low Heywood Thomas, and The Long Ridge School.

Stamford has one of the nation's most highly educated populations: nine out of ten are high school graduates, and those possessing a bachelor's degree or higher are estimated at 43.6% of the population. Stamford is tied with Iowa City, Iowa, for the U.S. metropolitan area with the highest percentage of the adult population holding a bachelor's degree or higher; 44% of adults hold a degree.

Media
NBC Sports Group world headquarters is in Stamford, connected to Chelsea Piers Connecticut. All studios are based in Stamford, including Football Night in America, and all the NBC Olympic coverage.
 Three NBCUniversal syndicated programs relocated to Stamford's Rich Forum: Maury came to Stamford from New York City, while Jerry Springer and The Steve Wilkos Show were previously based in Chicago.
 Television show The People's Court has taped in Stamford since 2012.
ITV America announced the opening of a major production office in Stamford with 450 employees, along with a digital media incubator program. Televisions shows produced in Stamford include Hell's Kitchen, Pawn Stars, The Real Housewives of New Jersey, Queer Eye on Netflix, and The Four: Battle for Stardom.
WWE has had its global headquarters in Stamford since 1985, when it was Titan Sports.
Fortune 100 company Charter Communications' world headquarters has been based in Stamford since 2012. Charter distributes services through its Spectrum brand.
 Stamford serves as a major office for YES Network, The Yankee Entertainment and Sports Network.
A+E Networks has a major production studio based in Stamford.
Soap operas All My Children and One Life to Live were taped in Stamford in 2013.
This Old House relocated its headquarters to Stamford from Manhattan in 2016, and has about 50 employees in the city.
 Stephen David Entertainment, a division of Banijay Group, opened a production office in Stamford in 2019.
Who Wants to Be a Millionaire started taping in 2014 at the Connecticut Film Center.
Synapse Group, part of Time Inc. now owned by Dotdash Meredith, is headquartered in Stamford.
 Chief Executive Group is headquartered in Stamford, and publishes Chief Executive Magazine.
 The fictional movie Take My Hand from the episode "I Heart Connecticut" of the NBC show 30 Rock was set and shot in Stamford.
 Stamford served as a location for one of five branches of the fictional Dunder Mifflin paper company on the US television series The Office. The branch was shown during several episodes during the 3rd season of the show, and exterior shots were of the former Starwood headquarters building at 333 Ludlow in Stamford's South End.
 The TBS sitcom Are We There Yet, starring Terry Crews, was shot at the Connecticut Film Center in Stamford.

Print media
Stamford Magazine, published by Moffly Media
Stamford Advocate, daily newspaper
The Stamford Times, weekly newspaper, owned by The Hour Newspapers.
Stamford Plus magazine is published by Canaiden LLC.
El Sol News, weekly Spanish-language newspaper.
La Voz, weekly Spanish-language newspaper.

Radio stations in the city
WEDW-FM 88.5; 2,000 watts, a National Public Radio station
WSTC-AM 1400; 1,000 watts; shares programming with WNLK-AM 1350
WEBE 108 -107.9 1400; 50,000 watts

Emergency services

Stamford Emergency Medical Services
A not-for-profit agency, Stamford Emergency Medical Services (SEMS) provides pre-hospital emergency care in Stamford, Connecticut. SEMS also provides contracted paramedic intercept response to Darien Emergency Medical Services, located in Darien, Connecticut. SEMS is the only Connecticut EMS service accredited by the Commission on the Accreditation of Ambulance Services (CAAS). All SEMS units are staffed by at least one Connecticut-licensed paramedic. Stamford EMS responds to 14,000 calls annually.

In Stamford, medical facilities include:
Stamford Hospital, Level II Trauma Center
 Tully Health Center
 Franklin Street Community Health Center

Fire department
Fire protection in the city of Stamford is provided by the paid Stamford Fire Department (SFD) and four all-volunteer fire departments—Glenbrook-New Hope, Belltown, Springdale, and Turn of River—plus a combination company (paid and volunteer members), Long Ridge.

Budgeting and districting of the various fire departments throughout the city had been unstable since 2007, due to an extended legal conflict between the volunteer departments and the Malloy administration. As of May 16, 2012, a decision was reached by the city's charter revision committee to combine the paid and volunteer fire departments into one combination fire department, known as the Stamford Fire Department.

Police department
The Stamford Police Department (SPD) is Stamford's only police force, and has lost four officers in the line of service since 1938. The police force has about 280 sworn police officers making it the fifth largest police force in Connecticut after Hartford, New Haven, Bridgeport, and Waterbury. Most Stamford Officers were trained at the Connecticut Police Training Academy before patrolling in the city. Aside from Police Headquarters, located at 725 Bedford St., opened in 2019, in Downtown Stamford, SPD also operates substations in Stamford's West Side at Wilson St. and W. Main St., and at 1137 High Ridge Rd and Hope Street. The current Chief of Police is Tim Shaw since April 9, 2020 who was a police officer in Stamford before leaving to Easton, Connecticut and coming back to Stamford to become police chief.

Transportation

Mass transit
Stamford is on the New Haven Line of the Metro-North Railroad, the commuter rail system for northern metropolitan New York City. Stamford is the second-busiest station on the Metro-North system, after Grand Central Terminal, and serves as a major transfer point for local trains. Two smaller train stations in Stamford are Glenbrook and Springdale, both a part of the New Canaan branch.

Commuter trains come into Stamford from all points between New London to the east and New York (Grand Central Terminal) to the south. The average nonstop commute is 47 minutes. Trains operate from the Stamford station between 4:43 a.m. (first departure to Grand Central) until 12:55 a.m. (last departure to Grand Central).

Stamford also serves as a station along the Amtrak route. Acela, the high speed train service between Boston and Washington, makes several daily stops in Stamford. Amtrak's Northeast Regional (Springfield, Massachusetts to Washington, D.C.) and Vermonter (Saint Albans, Vermont to Washington, D.C.) also make daily stops in Stamford. Amtrak tickets can be purchased on the upper level of the Stamford station.

Airports
Stamford is within reasonable distance of 11 airports: four general aviation, two regional, five international.

Buses
City bus transportation is provided by CT Transit, which is run and financed by the Connecticut Department of Transportation. The main terminal is adjacent to the train station on State Street, under the I-95 highway. Bus service runs along major arterial roads through the towns of Darien, Norwalk, Greenwich and Port Chester, New York. A non-stop direct route is also offered to White Plains, New York. Commuters can connect in Norwalk to points as far east as Milford and as far north as Danbury. Additional connections can be made in Port Chester and White Plains to all points covered by the Bee-Line bus system in Westchester County.

Greyhound provides inter-city bus service from the lower level of the Stamford train station. Bus service is provided to New Haven (Union Station), Boston (South Station), and New York (Port Authority).

Highways
Two limited-access highways run through the city. Interstate 95 serves as the main route through downtown Stamford with four exits (6–9). The Merritt Parkway runs through the northern part of the city. This road is designated for passenger vehicles only. Any congestion on the Merritt Parkway is mostly likely to occur on the southbound lane in the morning and the northbound in the evening (route to and from New York). At night, due to the absence of lighting, visibility on the Merritt Parkway is relatively poor. Stamford exits on the Merritt Parkway are 33–35, and exit 36 is just over the border in New Canaan.

Stamford is also served by four other state highways. Route1, also known as Main Street in Stamford, is also used as a major artery during the morning and evening commute. Most traffic via Route1 is short distance or fairly local, yet vehicles have utilized Route1 during times of heavy congestion on I-95 as a re-route. Route 137 (Washington Boulevard and High Ridge Road) is the main north–south road of the city and runs from the Stamford Transportation Center and serves the Turn of River, North Stamford, and High Ridge sections of the city. Route 104 (Long Ridge Road) branches off from Route 137 to serve the Long Ridge section. Route 106 (Courtland Avenue) serves the Glenbrook neighborhood and continues towards the town of Darien.

Notable people

Noteworthy past and present residents include:
 Alvin Alden (1818–1882), Wisconsin state legislator
 Revington Arthur (1908–1986), painter, educator
 Andrew P. Bakaj (born 1982), former Department of Defense and CIA official, lead counsel for the whisteblower during the inquiry and subsequent impeachment of President Donald Trump, born and raised in Stamford
 Albert K. Dawson (1885–1967), photojournalist and film correspondent in World War I. His firm, Brown & Dawson, was based in Stamford from 1912 to 1919.
 Candace Owens (born 1989), political pundit, born and raised in Stamford
 Dana Delany (born 1956), actress, grew up in Stamford
 Willy DeVille (1950–2009), R&B singer and composer, born in Stamford
 Greg Farshtey (born 1965), author and editor at Lego, known for his work on Bionicle, grew up in Stamford
 William Phillips Hall (1864–1932) born in Stamford, transportation executive, lay preacher
 Harry Houdini (1874–1926), escape artist, had a summer home in Stamford
 Bernard Jackson (born 1959), singer of R&B music, born in Stamford
 Robert Kravchuk (born 1955), author, scholar, born in Stamford
 Cyndi Lauper (born 1953), singer, has a home in North Stamford
 Christopher Lloyd (born 1938), actor, born in Stamford
 Meat Loaf (Michael Lee Aday; 1947–2022), rock singer and songwriter, lived in Stamford 1979–1981, coached Babe Ruth League and Little League baseball
 Dan Malloy (born 1955), former governor of Connecticut
 Frank J. Marion (1869–1963), pioneer of motion pictures, founder of Kalem Company, who built and lived at Marion Castle
 Vince McMahon (born 1945) and Linda McMahon (born 1948), founders of World Wrestling Entertainment
 Don Morrow (1927–2020), actor, announcer, voiceover artist
 Chris Noth (born 1954), actor, grew up in Stamford
 Gilda Radner (1946–1989), comedian, actress, wife of Gene Wilder, lived in the city
 Jackie Robinson (1919–1972), baseball player, made North Stamford his home later in his life; one of the Stamford little leagues is named after him
 Alex Rodriguez (born 1975), baseball player
 Stephen Sondheim (1930–2021), composer, lived in North Stamford as a boy
 Grant Tinker (1926–2016), former husband of Mary Tyler Moore and former chairman and CEO of NBC (1981–1986), was born in the city
 Bobby Valentine (born 1950), former baseball player manager, owner of downtown sports bar "Bobby V's"
 Vivian Vance (1909–1979), actress who starred as Ethel Mertz in I Love Lucy
 Mort Walker (1923–2018), cartoonist for Beetle Bailey and Hi and Lois
 Gene Wilder (1933–2016), actor and director, lived and died in the city

Sister cities
  Afula, Israel
  Jiangdu, Jiangsu, China
  Lima, Peru
  Minturno, Lazio, Italy
  Settefrati, Lazio, Italy
  Sparta, Greece

See also

 History of Stamford, Connecticut
 National Register of Historic Places listings in Stamford, Connecticut
 Thomas Seavey Hall - textile manufacturer, headquartered in Stamford

References

Further reading

External links

 
 Stamford Historical Society
 Stamford Downtown Special Services District
 

 
Cities in Connecticut
Cities in the New York metropolitan area
Cities in Fairfield County, Connecticut
Populated coastal places in Connecticut
Year of establishment missing